William Samuel Johnson (October 7, 1727 – November 14, 1819) was an American Founding Father and statesman. Before the Revolutionary War, he served as a militia lieutenant before being relieved following his rejection of his election to the First Continental Congress. He was notable for signing the United States Constitution, for representing Connecticut in the United States Senate, and for serving as the third president of Columbia University, then known as Columbia College.

Early life

William Samuel Johnson was born in Stratford, Connecticut, on October 7, 1727 to Samuel Johnson, a well-known Anglican clergyman and later founding president of King's (Columbia) College, and Johnson's first wife, Charity Floyd Nicoll. Johnson received his primary education at home. He then graduated from Yale College in 1744, going on to receive a master's degree from his alma mater in 1747 (as well as an honorary degree from Harvard the same year).

Career
Although his father urged him to enter the clergy, Johnson decided instead to pursue a legal career. Self-educated in the law, he quickly developed an important clientele and established business connections extending beyond the boundaries of his native colony. He also held a commission in the Connecticut colonial militia for over 20 years, rising to the rank of colonel, and he served in the lower house (1761 and 1765) and upper house (1766 and 1771–1775) of the Connecticut Legislature. He was a member of the colony's Supreme Court (1772–1774).

Johnson was first attracted to the Patriot cause by what he and his associates considered Parliament's unwarranted interference in the government of the colonies. He attended the Stamp Act Congress in 1765 and served on the committee that addressed the king ,arguing the right of the colonies to decide tax policies for themselves. He opposed the Townshend Acts passed by Parliament in 1767 to pay for the French and Indian War and supported the non-importation agreements devised by the colonies to protest taxation without representation.

American Revolution

Johnson lived in London from 1767 to 1771, serving as Connecticut's agent in its attempt to settle the colony's title to Indian lands. He sharply criticized British policy toward the colonies. His experience in Britain convinced him that Britain's policy was shaped more by ignorance of American conditions and not through the sinister designs of a wicked government, as many Patriots alleged. As the Patriots became more radical in their demands, Johnson found it difficult to commit himself wholeheartedly to the cause. Although he believed British policy unwise, he found it difficult to break his own connections with the mother country. A scholar of international renown, he had many friends in Britain and among the American Loyalists. As the English author Samuel Johnson said of him, "Of all those whom the various accidents of life have brought within my notice, there is scarce anyone whose acquaintance I have more desired to cultivate than yours." He was also bound to Britain by religious and professional ties. He enjoyed close associations with the Anglican Church in England and with the scholarly community at Oxford, which awarded him an honorary degree in 1766.

Fearing the consequences of independence for both the colonies and the mother country, Johnson sought to avoid extremism and to reach a compromise on the outstanding political differences between the protagonists. He rejected his election to the First Continental Congress, a move strongly criticized by the Patriots, who subsequently removed him from his militia command. He was also strongly criticized when seeking an end to the fighting after the Battles of Lexington and Concord, he personally visited the British commander General Thomas Gage. The incident led to his arrest for communicating with the enemy, but the charges were eventually dropped. He felt that the American Revolution was not necessary and that independence would be bad for everyone concerned.

New nation
Once independence was achieved, Johnson felt free to participate in the government of the new nation, serving in the Congress of the Confederation (1785–1787). His influence as a delegate was recognized by his contemporaries. Jeremiah Wadsworth wrote of him to a friend, "Dr. Johnson has, I believe, much more influence than either you or myself. The Southern Delegates are vastly fond of him." In 1785, the Vermont Republic granted Johnson a town in the former King's College Tract in thanks for representing the interests of Vermont before the Continental Congress. The town of Johnson, Vermont, the former Johnson State College, and Johnson Street   in Madison, Wisconsin bear his name.

Constitutional Convention
In 1787, Johnson played a major role as one of the Philadelphia Convention's delegates. His eloquent speeches on the subject of representation carried great weight during the debate. He looked to a strong federal government to protect the rights of Connecticut and the other small states from encroachment by their more powerful neighbors. He supported the New Jersey Plan, which called for equal representation of the states in the national legislature.

In general, he favored extension of federal authority. He argued that the judicial power "ought to extend to equity as well as law" (the words "in law and equity" were adopted at his motion). He denied that there could be treason against a separate state since sovereignty was "in the Union." He opposed prohibition of any ex post facto law, one which made an act a criminal offense retroactively because such prohibition implied "an improper suspicion of the National Legislature."

Johnson was influential even in the final stages of framing the Constitution. He gave his fullest support to the Connecticut Compromise, which foreshadowed the final Great Compromise, with a national legislature with a Senate that provided equal representation for all states and a House of Representatives based on population. He also served on and chaired the five-member Committee of Style, which framed the final form of the document.

In her 1966 book, Miracle at Philadelphia, Catherine Drinker Bowen calls Johnson "the perfect man to preside over these four masters of argument and political strategy [i.e. fellow committee members Alexander Hamilton, Gouverneur Morris, James Madison, and Rufus King].... His presence on the committee must have been reassuring; the doctor's quiet manner disarmed."

Notes

References 
 
 
 Graff, Nancy Price. Visible Layers of Time: A Perspective on the History and Architecture of Johnson Vermont. The University of Vermont, Historic Preservation Program: 1990.
 McCaughey, Elizabeth P. "William Samuel Johnson, The Loyal Whig" in William M. Fowler Jr. and Wallace Coyle, eds. American Revolution: Changing Perspectives (1979), pp. 69–102
 Beardsley, E. Edwards. Life and Times of William Samuel Johnson, LL.D. (1876)

External links
 

1727 births
1819 deaths
People from Stratford, Connecticut
People of colonial Connecticut
Continental Congressmen from Connecticut
Signers of the United States Constitution
Pro-Administration Party United States senators from Connecticut
Politicians from Bridgeport, Connecticut
Justices of the Connecticut Supreme Court
Colonial agents
Military personnel from Bridgeport, Connecticut
Yale College alumni
Columbia University faculty
Presidents of Columbia University
American slave owners
United States senators who owned slaves
Founding Fathers of the United States